Probable phospholipid-transporting ATPase IF is an enzyme that in humans is encoded by the ATP11B gene.

Function 

P-type ATPases, such as ATP11B, are phosphorylated in their intermediate state and drive uphill transport of ions across membranes. Several subfamilies of P-type ATPases have been identified. One subfamily transports heavy metal ions, such as Cu(2+) or Cd(2+). Another subfamily transports non-heavy metal ions, such as H(+), Na(+), K(+), or Ca(+). A third subfamily transports amphipaths, such as phosphatidylserine.

References

External links

Further reading